Laboratoires Pierre Fabre is a French multinational pharmaceutical and cosmetics company. The company had a consolidated turnover of 1.978 billion euros in 2012 (including 54% international). It is headquartered in the city of Castres, Midi-Pyrénées, France.

Founded in 1962 by Pierre Fabre (1926-2013), the company is present in over 130 countries.  Laboratories Pierre Fabre had approximately 10,000 employees in 2012, 33% of whom are internationally based, while the remaining 6,700 employees were based in France.  The company's business activity is focused on research, development, manufacturing and marketing of cosmetics, prescription medicines and family health products.  Pharmaceuticals and phytotherapy represent 47% of turnover, whereas cosmetics represent 53%  (percentages of 2012 turnover).

Pierre Fabre is best known for its vinorelbine (Navelbine), an anticancer drug of the vinca alkaloid class.  They also developed vinflunine, a fluorinated vinca alkaloid derivative available in Australia for "advanced or metastatic transitional cell carcinoma of the urothelial tract after failure of a prior platinum containing regimen."

Olivier Bohuon was Chief Executive from September 2010 to April 2011.

The Pierre Fabre Foundation
The Pierre Fabre Foundation was recognized as a public utility in 1999 and its mission is to enable communities from less advanced and emerging countries, as well as those plunged into severe crisis by political or economic upheaval and/or natural disaster, to access the quality and levels of everyday health care and the widely-used drugs defined by the WHO and other organisations as essential to human health.

References

External links
  Pierre Fabre laboratories - Official site

Pharmaceutical companies of France
Pharmaceutical companies established in 1962
Companies based in Paris
French brands